Eardwulf (or Heardwulf) was a medieval Bishop of Dunwich.

Eardwulf was consecrated sometime before 747 and died after that date.

References

External links
 

Bishops of Dunwich (ancient)